Coleophora salinella is a moth of the family Coleophoridae found in Europe.

Description
The wingspan is 8.5–13 mm.

Distribution
It is found from Great Britain to Ukraine, south to the Iberian Peninsula, Sicily and Cyprus.

References

  sea purslane

salinella
Moths described in 1859
Moths of Europe
Taxa named by Henry Tibbats Stainton